Stryfe is a fictional supervillain appearing in American comic books published by Marvel Comics, most commonly in association with the superhero team X-Force. He is a clone of Cable from an alternate future timeline.

Publication history

The character was created by Louise Simonson and Rob Liefeld, and first appears in The New Mutants #86 (February 1990), a cameo appearance in which his head cannot be seen. His first full appearance was in the following issue, The New Mutants #87 (March 1990). A clone of Cable, Stryfe is the main antagonist in the 1990s crossover X-Cutioner's Song, the 2009 X-Force/Cable crossover Messiah War, and the 2014 Cable & X-Force/Uncanny X-Force crossover "Vendetta".

Stryfe appears as the main villain of the 2018–2019 run of X-Force.

Fictional character biography
A woman introducing herself as Askani appears to Cyclops and Jean Grey from the distant future after their infant son, Nathan Summers, is infected with a techno-organic virus by the immortal mutant Apocalypse and tells them that she can save the child. Nathan then arrives in the future and Mother Askani clones the baby, hoping to salvage something if he dies. The clone's growth is greatly accelerated until he is the same age as Nathan himself. The Askani succeed in halting the spread of the techno-organic virus in Nathan's body, thereby saving his life. However, Apocalypse and his forces attack the Askani's hiding place and steal the cloned infant. Apocalypse takes the child as his own, raising him himself and naming him "Stryfe", intending to use him as his next host body. Stryfe grows into a murderously decadent brat with no regard for life who is both terminally bored by having his every desire catered and extremely lonely at having no real company aside from Apocalypse and Ch'vayre (Apocalypse's second in command). Years later, as Apocalypse is about to transfer his essence into Stryfe, he discovers that Stryfe is in fact a clone, thus unfit to house his essence. A teenage Nathan and the time-traveling Cyclops and Jean confront Apocalypse, leaving him unable to transfer into any host body, thus causing his essence to discorporate. Ch'vayre raises Stryfe afterwards.

Stryfe grows up to be an embittered madman, wanting vengeance on both what he thought were his real parents (Cyclops and Jean) and his spiritual parent Apocalypse. He becomes an anarchist and terrorist rebel in the Nor-Am Pact region 3783–3806 in his alternate future. He raises an army and for years became a fierce opponent of both Cable (Nathan Summers) and his Clan Chosen, and the New Canaanites, a despotic regime that replaced Apocalypse's. Stryfe reveals to Cable much later in the present era that during this period in their life, he raped Aliya Dayspring (Cable's wife who Stryfe had grown to desire) at one point by pretending to be Cable and so the father of Tyler Dayspring could be Stryfe and not Cable. Later, he kills Aliya as well as kidnapping and brainwashing their son Tyler.

In 3806, the New Canaanites take full control of the planet, but Stryfe manages to travel back in time two-thousand years. He forms a mutant terrorist group, the Mutant Liberation Front (MLF), alongside many powerful mutants including Tamara Kurtz. Stryfe orders his Mutant Liberation Front to capture Rusty Collins and Skids. In Japan, he fights Cable and clashes with the New Mutants, who thwart his attempt to poison the water supplies of major cities. Stryfe abandons his Antarctic Mutant Liberation Front base during an invasion by X-Force (a team composed of Cable and several former New Mutants). Stryfe then has the Mutant Liberation Front free the captive mutants Hairbag and Slab, and turns them over to Mister Sinister before ordering an MLF attack on a clinic. He also confronts and defeats Kane, and eventually declares his enmity for Apocalypse. Stryfe later battles Cable, who learns that Stryfe is actually his double. Stryfe sows chaos in the ranks of the X-Men, posing as Cable and shooting Professor X with an infected bullet, and taking Cyclops and Jean Grey captive. He bests the Dark Riders and Apocalypse, making him leader of the Dark Riders. As a final insurance, Stryfe gives Mister Sinister a canister that he claims holds genetic material from two-thousand years worth of Summers's descendants; in truth, it holds the deadly Legacy Virus. Stryfe battles Cable until the latter opens a temporal rift by detonating a self-destruct system, destroying his body. Stryfe's consciousness, however, enters Cable's mind, in which he stays until he voluntarily leaves.

While physically dead, Stryfe attempts to return to life through the body of Warpath. However, his attempt is avoided by the arrival of X-Force and Warpath is sent back to the living by Blackheart.

By unknown means, Stryfe revives and attempts to subjugate Latveria. Stryfe is opposed by Cable and Nate Grey, and at first beats them easily, even going as far as to siphon off all of Nate's power. Madelyne Pryor appears to join forces with Stryfe, but secretly steals the psionic energy from Stryfe and gives it back to Nate. Nate, Madelyne, and Cable join forces to defeat Stryfe.

Stryfe reappears, controlling the activation sequence for the Prime Sentinels. He uses them to hunt down Lady Deathstrike, who holds the complete codes for all the Sentinels in her cybernetic systems. Deathstrike is forced to turn to the X-Men, and together they defeat Stryfe, who teleports away.

Later, Stryfe experiences a personal existential crisis and becomes depressed at the futility of his efforts over the years after the X-Men finally manage to cure the Legacy Virus, which Stryfe considered to be his life's work and the one permanent victory he had against Cable, his parents Scott and Jean, and the rest of the X-Men. He hunts down Bishop who is possessed by the entity La Bete Noir, whose power rivals the Phoenix Force and threatens to consume Bishop's body and unleash its evil upon the universe. However, Stryfe ultimately regrets the path he took and the choices he has made in his life (stemming from his perpetual identity crisis as a clone), frees Bishop from the entity and sacrifices himself to save the Earth by absorbing the Bete Noir into himself, shattering his body from the power overload. Gambit, however, is suspicious that Cable may have telepathically forced Stryfe to sacrifice himself.

Messiah War
During Messiah War, instead of dying, Stryfe was able to transport himself into the future where he is discovered by Bishop, who has been traveling through time in an attempt to kill Hope Summers. This was confirmed by the writer Christopher Yost to be the same Stryfe that had previously plagued the X-Men, mentioning in particular his survival of his fight against Nate Grey and Cable. Bishop propositioned a chance to kill Apocalypse, if Stryfe aided him in killing Cable, who Stryfe said he no longer cared about. After Bishop initiated a global catastrophe that wiped out most of the people on Earth, Stryfe was able to step in and fill the leadership void. Together, Stryfe and Bishop traveled to 2963 A.D., where their combined efforts attacked Apocalypse while he slept in his rejuvenation chamber, and defeated him, assuming they killed him. Stryfe stole his Celestial Ship and technology and used it to raise an army that gave him total control over the people, save for a small rebellion. Stryfe tyrannically ruled over his subjects, the Stryfetroopers, with Bishop as his right-hand-man for nearly a decade. Stryfe placed Ship in Westchester County, New York and renamed the city, New Celestial City. Shortly after building his empire, Stryfe employed Deadpool as security and imprisoned Kiden Nixon, who was used to create a chronal net, preventing anyone from jumping out of the timeline. However, when Stryfe was reminded by Wolverine that he already "died a hero" to just become a villain again, Stryfe claims to not know what he is talking about. Cable, Deadpool, a time-displaced X-Force and Apocalypse join forces to defeat Stryfe and Bishop. Cable and Hope travel further into the future, X-Force return to the present, and Apocalypse drags Stryfe away, intending to use him as a new host body for his essence.

Vendetta
Stryfe is able to prevent Apocalypse from using his body as a new host and travels back in time to the present in the Cable and X-Force and Uncanny X-Force crossover, "Vendetta". Upon discovering that Bishop has returned to the present, Hope tries to kill him in an act of vengeance. Stryfe appears and kidnaps them both and brings them to an old, abandoned Mutant Liberation Force base.  There, he attempts to manipulate Hope into killing Bishop who has come to realize the error of his ways. Stryfe explains to Bishop how he wants him to suffer after he betrayed him during Messiah War and claims that he was imprisoned and tortured by Apocalypse for years until he planned a successful escape and killed him. Stryfe tries to corrupt Hope by making her give in to her feelings of hatred towards Bishop, convincing her to take revenge and murder Bishop although he is shackled and refuses to fight back out of remorse. Cable and both teams of X-Force soon intervene and combat Stryfe. Hope sees that Stryfe is trying to undo the lessons which Cable taught her and refuses to kill Bishop but she does severely injure him. Stryfe is defeated by Cable and both X-Force teams, but before escaping he telepathically forces Hope to mimic his vast and nearly uncontrollable psionic power in the hope that she will destroy her friends. Bishop helps her to disperse the massive energy and they come to an uneasy truce.

Powers and abilities
Stryfe is a clone of the mutant Cable and, as a result, possesses Cable's natural vast psionic abilities of telepathy and telekinesis. However, these abilities are far more powerful than the ones Cable has generally displayed in the main continuity, sufficient to block the use of Cyclops and Jean Grey's superhuman powers. This is because Stryfe was never infected with Apocalypse's techno-organic virus like Cable was. Therefore, he does not have to constantly expend his abilities to keep the virus from consuming his body, which apparently was a huge drain on Cable's capabilities. Stryfe can use his psionic abilities in a variety of ways such as moving large objects with his mind, reading minds, mind control, telepathically negating and activating the use of other's powers, telepathic camouflage, telekinetic flight, telekinetic force fields, mind transference and telekinetic blasts. Stryfe also has far more control over his massive psionic abilities than Cable or Nate Grey, apparently from having a whole lifetime of experience of learning how to use his powers which his alternate counterparts never had. Stryfe also possessed other abilities through genetic manipulation similar to those that Cable achieved through cybernetic augmentation, including superhuman strength and durability.

Stryfe wears battle armor of unknown composition that is highly impervious to damage. He has been known to wield a blade capable of harming Apocalypse. He has used various advanced weaponry and technology from the 39th century of his alternate future, including his time-vortex field generator.

Stryfe has received extensive training in military combat techniques and the martial arts, and is a master marksman with firearms. He is a cunning terrorist strategist.

Reception
 In 2017, WhatCulture ranked Stryfe 3rd in their "10 Most Evil X-Men Villains" list.

Other versions

Ultimate Marvel
In Ultimate X-Men, Ultimate Stryfe is also the leader of the Mutant Liberation Front. He appears to be a mutant supremacist convinced that Professor X was killed by the United States government and that mutants should fight against the government. His mutant power manifests as the ability to cause "strife" within people's minds, causing them to voice whatever is bothering them. However, when Psylocke scans his mind she senses that he has no real conviction in what he says, suggesting that much of his mutant supremacist attitude is an act, meaning his real motives are unknown. At his side is the ultimate version of Zero, a young mutant teleporter. It is revealed that Stryfe is actually a con man, working with Fenris to promote mutant unrest so they can sell Sentinels to the government.

In Ultimate X-Men, when Cable returns from the future with Xavier they both don armor; Xavier's resembling Onslaught and Cable's resembling the mainstream Stryfe.

Deadpool Pulp
In the Deadpool Pulp timeline, a General Stryfe is introduced. Stryfe is a younger, corrupt General, who alongside Cable and J. Edgar Hoover hire Wade Wilson (who in this timeline is a former CIA man, turned merc) to get back a stolen nuclear briefcase. Stryfe is later killed by Deadpool.

In other media

Television
 Stryfe appeared briefly in X-Men: The Animated Series. In the episode "Beyond Good and Evil" (Part 4), he was one of Apocalypse's captured psychics.

Video games
 Stryfe was the final boss in the Sega Game Gear game X-Men 2: Game Master's Legacy.
 Stryfe appears as a boss in X-Men Legends II: Rise of Apocalypse, voiced by Daniel Riordan. He is guarding the prison in Apocaplyse's tower in which Banshee and Iron Man are being held captive. To help defeat Stryfe, the players will need to use a Psychic Demon Spawn Control to create a Psychic Demon to help them fight Stryfe. He has special dialogue with Toad.

Other appearances
 An action figure of Stryfe was produced by Toy Biz in 1992 as part of the first X-Force line. He was packaged with a snap-on cape, adamantium mace accessory and a flip-up helmet to reveal his identity.
 A second action figure of Stryfe was produced by Hasbro in 2014 as part of their Marvel Legends line. He is packaged with a golden sword and the head of his set's Build-A-Figure (BAF) Jubilee.
 Stryfe has been made in two playing pieces in the Heroclix game system. Both versions have the Armor, Future, and Mutant Liberation Front keywords. The first version debuted in the 2010 Heroclix set Giant-Size X-Men and is played at 116 pts, while the second version debuted in the 2017 Heroclix set Deadpool and X-Force and is played at 135 pts.

References

External links
 Stryfe at Marvel Universe

Characters created by Louise Simonson
Characters created by Rob Liefeld
Clone characters in comics
Comics characters introduced in 1990
Fictional characters from parallel universes
Fictional mass murderers
Marvel Comics characters who have mental powers
Marvel Comics characters with superhuman strength
Marvel Comics male supervillains
Marvel Comics mutants
Marvel Comics telekinetics
Marvel Comics telepaths
X-Men supporting characters